DJ Drama Presents: The Preview is a mixtape by Ludacris and DJ Drama as promotion for Ludacris' album Theater of the Mind and his film releases in the fall of 2008. Ludacris wanted to create a mixtape that captured his image as a southern rapper and movie actor. The mixtape was released on July 28, 2008 at WeMix.com.

Controversy
The song "Politics as Usual" has caused a lot controversy due to lyrics in the song criticizing and insulting Reverend Jesse Jackson ("Now Jesse talkin' slick and apologizin' for what?/If you said it then you meant it, how you want it? Head or gut?"), McCain ("McCain don't belong in any chair unless he's paralyzed"), President Bush ("Yeah I said it, 'cause Bush is mentally handicapped/Ball up all of his speeches and just throw 'em like candy wraps/'Cause what you talkin' I hear nothin' even relevant/And you the worst of all 43 presidents") and Hillary Clinton ("Hilary hated on you, so that bitch is irrelevant").

Track listing

References

Preview, The
2008 mixtape albums
DJ Drama albums